Fabrice Guelzec (born 21 March 1968) is a French gymnast. He competed in seven events at the 1992 Summer Olympics. He is the son of Olympic gymnast Georges Guelzec

References

External links
 
 
 

1968 births
Living people
French male artistic gymnasts
Olympic gymnasts of France
Gymnasts at the 1992 Summer Olympics
Sportspeople from Nantes